The  is a  Japanese freight railway line which connects  with Okunoyahama Freight Terminal in Ibaraki Prefecture. It is owned and run by the Kashima Rinkai Railway. The line opened on 12 July 1970.

Stations

References

Kashima Rinkai Railway
Railway lines opened in 1970